David George Alexander Clarke was an Anglican priest.

Clarke was educated at Trinity College, Dublin and ordained in 1949. He served at: Dromore (curacy); Clonbroney, Clogher, Abbeystrewry, Usworth and Kilrossanty (incumbencies); St Patrick's Cathedral, Dublin (Prebendary); and Cashel (Dean). He retired in 1983.

Notes

Alumni of Trinity College Dublin
Deans of Cashel
20th-century Irish Anglican priests
Possibly living people